Monique Moana Fischer (born 19 December 1991) is a New Zealand-born Samoan professional footballer who plays as a midfielder for Italian Serie B club UPC Tavagnacco and the Samoa women's national team. At club level, she previously played in the English FA Women's Super League for Yeovil Town.

Club career
Fischer played club football for Papatoetoe AFC and represented Auckland Football in the National Women's League (New Zealand) while working as a journalist for TVNZ. After moving to the United Kingdom to pursue a professional football career, she signed for Welsh Premier Women's Football League club Cardiff Met. in 2017.

In September 2018, Fischer made her professional debut for Yeovil Town against Tottenham Hotspur in the 2018–19 FA Women's League Cup. She suffered a clavicle fracture in Yeovil's next match, a 7–0 defeat by Arsenal. Yeovil finished a distant last in the 2018–19 FA WSL and incurred a 10-point penalty for insolvency. The club was then kicked out of the top two Leagues when The FA rejected their purported business plan. Fischer signed for Champions League qualifying Swiss Club Lugano FFC in January 2020 in the Serie A.

International career
At international level Fischer has played for the Samoa women's national football team, including at the 2015 Pacific Games in Port Moresby.

References

External links

1991 births
Living people
People with acquired Samoan citizenship
Samoan women's footballers
Women's association football midfielders
Cardiff Met. Ladies F.C. players
Yeovil Town L.F.C. players
FF Lugano 1976 players
Mallbackens IF players
U.P.C. Tavagnacco players
Welsh Premier Women's Football League players
Women's Super League players
Swiss Women's Super League players
Elitettan players
Segunda Federación (women) players
Samoa women's international footballers
Samoan expatriate footballers
Samoan expatriate sportspeople in Wales
Expatriate women's footballers in Wales
Samoan expatriate sportspeople in England
Expatriate women's footballers in England
Samoan expatriate sportspeople in Italy
Expatriate women's footballers in Italy
Expatriate women's footballers in Switzerland
Expatriate women's footballers in Sweden
Samoan expatriate sportspeople in Spain
Expatriate women's footballers in Spain
Association footballers from Auckland
New Zealand women's association footballers
Papatoetoe AFC players
New Zealand expatriate association footballers
New Zealand expatriate sportspeople in Wales
New Zealand expatriate sportspeople in England
New Zealand expatriate sportspeople in Italy
New Zealand expatriate sportspeople in Switzerland
New Zealand expatriate sportspeople in Sweden
New Zealand expatriate sportspeople in Spain
New Zealand women journalists
New Zealand sportspeople of Samoan descent